Marquise Simmons (born November 9, 1989) is an American former professional basketball player. He played collegiately in the Atlantic 10 Conference for the St. Bonaventure Bonnies.

Professional career
Simmons turned professional in 2014, when he signed his first contract with Aris Leeuwarden.

In 2015, Simmons signed with Njarðvík of the Icelandic Úrvalsdeild karla. He was released by the club in December 2015. In 9 league games, Simmons averaged 18.7 points and 11.4 rebounds.

On January 11, 2016Simmons signed with Zorg en Zekerheid Leiden.

References

External links
St. Bonaventure bio
Icelandic statistics at kki.is
Profile at realgm.com

1989 births
Living people
American expatriate basketball people in Iceland
American expatriate basketball people in the Netherlands
Aris Leeuwarden players
Basketball players from Washington, D.C.
Dutch Basketball League players
Power forwards (basketball)
St. Bonaventure Bonnies men's basketball players
B.S. Leiden players
American men's basketball players
Njarðvík men's basketball players
Úrvalsdeild karla (basketball) players